Ceratomyxa cutmorei is a myxosporean parasite that infects gall-bladders of serranid fishes from the Great Barrier Reef. It was first found on Epinephelus fasciatus.

References

Further reading

External links

Animal parasites of fish
Veterinary parasitology
Animals described in 2009
Ceratomyxidae